Chaetura is a genus of needletail swifts found in the Americas. Although they resemble swallows, the two are not at all closely related; this is instead a result of convergent evolution. Some members of Chaetura are long-distance migrants, while others are year-round residents.

The genus name is derived from the Greek khaite, for long flowing hair, and oura, for tail, referring to the stiff feathers projecting from the end of the tail.

 Grey-rumped swift – Chaetura cinereiventris
Band-rumped swift – Chaetura spinicauda
 Lesser Antillean swift – Chaetura martinica
 Costa Rican swift – Chaetura fumosa
 Pale-rumped swift – Chaetura egregia
 Chimney swift – Chaetura pelagica
 Vaux's swift – Chaetura vauxi
 Chapman's swift – Chaetura chapmani
Ashy-tailed swift – Chaetura andrei
 Sick's swift – Chaetura meridionalis
 Short-tailed swift – Chaetura brachyura

A fossil species, Chaetura baconica, was described from Late Miocene deposits of Hungary.

References

 
Bird genera